Virzhiniya Mikhaylova (born 1 January 1932) is a Bulgarian athlete. She competed in the women's discus throw at the 1964 Summer Olympics.

References

1932 births
Living people
Athletes (track and field) at the 1964 Summer Olympics
Bulgarian female discus throwers
Olympic athletes of Bulgaria
Place of birth missing (living people)